Vyazovoye is a rural locality (a selo) and the administrative center of Vyazovskoye Rural Settlement, Prokhorovsky District, Belgorod Oblast, Russia. The population was 852 as of 2010. There are 10 streets.

Geography 
Vyazovoye is located 33 km northeast of Prokhorovka (the district's administrative centre) by road. Petrovka is the nearest rural locality.

References 

Rural localities in Prokhorovsky District